The Legend of Lasseter is a 1979 Australian documentary about Lasseter's Reef. It was produced by Lee Robinson and includes footage from his 1957 episode of High Adventure which he made with Lowell Thomas.

References

Australian documentary films
1979 films